Wadawurrung, also rendered as Wathawurrung, Wathaurong or Wada wurrung, and formerly sometimes Barrabool, is the Aboriginal Australian language spoken by the Wathaurong people of the Kulin Nation of Central Victoria. It was spoken by 15 clans south of the Werribee River and the Bellarine Peninsula to Streatham. Glottolog classifies Wathawurrung as extinct, however various regional programs and initiatives promote the usage and revitalisation of Wathaurong language

Phonology
Blake reconstructs Wadawurrung consonants as such;

Due to the varied nature of attestations of the language, Blake reconstructs Wadawurrung consonants in complacence to the standard features of the Australian Languages. 

It is presumed that Wadawurrung did not distinguish between voiced and unvoiced consonants ('Parrwong ~ Barwon' - Magpie).

What Blake attributes as a distinction between 'alveolar' and 'laminal' consonants is better described as a distinction between dental and post-alveolar pronunciation on nasal and stop consonants. This is a distinction in indigenous language families of the Australian south-east such as Yuin-Kuric (incl. Ngunnawal and Dharug) and the Gippsland languages (Incl. Dhudhuroa).

It is presumed there was no distinction between post-alveolar /n/ and palatal /ɲ/ ('Nhita' - to steal, fluctuates with 'nyita'). It is assumed that a similar correspondence occurs with the post-alveolar stop, thus mixed attestation between 'th', 'tj' & 'ty'.

The post-alveolar consonants /ʎ̟/, /t/ & /ɲ/ in word final position are rendered as 'yl', 'yt' & 'yn', respectively. E.g. 'Gowayn' - Eel. The word final nasal after /a/ is always cited as 'ayn' due to its fluctuation with 'ng' in sources

Blake asserts that sources do not differentiate between alveolar /r/ and retroflex /ɽ/ and the distinction is thus presumed from comparison to other Victorian Aboriginal Languages. Blake represents every rhotic as 'rr' unless drawing from modern sources such as Hercus.

Blake does not specify the number of vowels present in Wadawurrung. The standard set of 'a', 'e', 'i', 'o' & 'u', are used, however Blake notes a consistent correspondence between 'a', 'u' and 'o' in various sources ('Djinang' - foot, variously attested as 'jinnung', 'genong'). There is also fluctuation between 'a' and 'e' as the last vowel in a word ('walart' - possum, compared to 'wollert'), however Blake maintains that they are distinct vowels

Vocabulary

Place names 
Select placenames with attested origin in Wathawurrung language terms are;

Animal Names 
Wadawurrung vocabulary pertaining to local wildlife;

 'Djirnap' - Cockatoo
 'Goim', 'Kuyim' - Kangaroo
 'Ngurr-ngurr' - Wombat, presumably Vombatus Ursinus
 'Ngambulmum' - Koala, lit. 'bottom of a tree fork'
 'Mon.garrk', 'Mon.ngarrk' - Echidna
 'Perridak' - Platypus
 'Walart' - Possum. The term 'Walart-walart' refers to a possum skin cloak (Blake also lists 'Barnong' as a word pertaining to the Ringtail Possum specifically)

References

Kulin languages
Extinct languages of Victoria (Australia)